The 1918 South Carolina United States Senate election was held on Tuesday, November 5, simultaneously with the special senate election to elect the United States Senator for a six-year term from South Carolina.  Nathaniel B. Dial won the Democratic primary and was unopposed in the general election to win the six-year term to the Senate.

Democratic primary

Candidates
 Coleman Livingston Blease, former Governor of South Carolina
 Nathaniel B. Dial, former mayor of Laurens and candidate for Senate in 1912
 James F. Rice
 Benjamin Tillman, incumbent Senator since 1895 (died July 3)

Campaign
The primary election in 1918 for Senate was shaping up to be a contentious affair between Ben Tillman and Cole Blease, two of the state's most notorious demagogues.  Blease had performed surprisingly well in the 1916 gubernatorial election where he had almost knocked off incumbent Governor Richard Irvine Manning III.  The death of Tillman in July ended all prospects of an epic battle and the race became a contest between Blease and Nathaniel B. Dial.  The South Carolina Democratic Party held the primary on August 27 and Dial garnered over 50% of the vote to avoid a runoff election.  Blease suffered the worst loss of his political career mainly because of his vitriolic opposition to World War I which made him appear as a traitor.  There was no opposition to the Democratic candidate in the general election so Dial was elected to a six-year term in the Senate.

Results

General election results

|-
| 
| colspan=5 |Democratic hold
|-

See also
List of United States senators from South Carolina
1918 United States Senate elections
1918 United States House of Representatives elections in South Carolina
1918 South Carolina gubernatorial election

References

"Report of the Secretary of State to the General Assembly of South Carolina.  Part II." Reports of State Officers Boards and Committees to the General Assembly of the State of South Carolina. Volume II. Columbia, SC: 1919, p. 43.

1918
South Carolina
1918 South Carolina elections
1918 United States Senate election